The group stage featured 32 teams: the 22 automatic qualifiers and the 10 winners of the play-off round (five through the Champions Route, five through the League Route).

The teams were drawn into eight groups of four, and played each other home-and-away in a round-robin format. The matchdays were 13–14 September, 27–28 September, 18–19 October, 1–2 November, 22–23 November, and 6–7 December 2011.

The top two teams in each group advanced to the first knockout round, while the third-placed teams dropped down to the Europa League round of 32.

Seeding
The draw for the group stage was held at Grimaldi Forum, Monaco on 25 August 2011 at 17:45 CEST (UTC+02:00).

Teams were seeded into four pots based on their 2011 UEFA club coefficients. The title holders, Barcelona, were automatically seeded into Pot 1. Pot 1 held teams ranked 1–9, Pot 2 held teams ranked 10–24, Pot 3 held teams ranked 31–83, while Pot 4 held teams ranked 86–200 and unranked teams.

th Title Holder. The title holder automatically gets the top position of seeding list.

CR Qualified through Play-off round (Champions Route)

LR Qualified through Play-off round (League Route)

For the group stage draw, teams from the same national association cannot be drawn against each other. Moreover, the draw was controlled for teams from the same association in order to split the teams evenly into the two sets of groups (A–D, E–H) for maximum television coverage.

The fixtures were decided after the draw. On each matchday, four groups played their matches on Tuesday, while the other four groups played their matches on Wednesday, with the two sets of groups (A–D, E–H) alternating between each matchday. There are other restrictions, e.g., teams from the same city (e.g. Milan and Internazionale, which also share a stadium) do not play at home on the same matchday (UEFA tries to avoid teams from the same city playing at home on the same day or on consecutive days), and Russian teams do not play at home on the last matchday due to cold weather.

Tie-breaking criteria
If two or more teams were equal on points on completion of the group matches, the following criteria would be applied to determine the rankings:
 higher number of points obtained in the group matches played among the teams in question;
 superior goal difference from the group matches played among the teams in question;
 higher number of goals scored in the group matches played among the teams in question;
 higher number of goals scored away from home in the group matches played among the teams in question;
 If, after applying criteria 1) to 4) to several teams, two teams still have an equal ranking, the criteria 1) to 4) will be reapplied to determine the ranking of these teams;
 superior goal difference from all group matches played;
 higher number of goals scored from all group matches played;
 higher number of coefficient points accumulated by the club in question, as well as its association, over the previous five seasons.

Groups
Times are CET/CEST, as listed by UEFA (local times are in parentheses).

Group A

Group B

Group C

Notes
 Note 1: Oțelul Galați played their home matches at Arena Națională, Bucharest as their own Stadionul Oţelul did not meet UEFA criteria.

Group D

Tiebreakers
 Lyon and Ajax were tied on their head-to-head records as shown below, so Lyon are ranked ahead of Ajax because of their higher overall goal difference in the group.

Group E

Group F

Group G

Tiebreakers
 APOEL and Zenit St. Petersburg are ranked by their head-to-head records, as shown below.

Group H

Notes
 Note 2: Viktoria Plzeň played their home matches at Synot Tip Arena, Prague as their own Stadion města Plzně did not meet UEFA criteria.
 Note 3: BATE Borisov played their home matches at Dinamo Stadium, Minsk as their own City Stadium did not meet UEFA criteria.

Notes

References

External links
 2011–12 UEFA Champions League, UEFA.com

Group stage
UEFA Champions League group stages